Harinarayanpur is an archaeological site in the Kulpi CD block in the Diamond Harbour subdivision of the South 24 Parganas district in the Indian state of West Bengal.

Geography

Location
It has an elevation of 4m above mean sea level.

Note: The map alongside presents some of the notable locations in the subdivision. All places marked in the map are linked in the larger full screen map.

Findings
According to Sharmi Chakraborty, Centre for archaeological Studies and Training, Eastern India, terracotta plaques, semi-precious stone beads and pottery of the Sunga  Kushana period have been found.

References

Archaeological sites in West Bengal
South 24 Parganas district